Fighter Squadron 126 (VF-126) was an aggressor squadron of the U.S. Navy, and were known as the Fighting Seahawks, and after 1981 as the Bandits. The squadron was originally established as Attack Squadron 126 (VA-126) on 6 April 1956, it was redesignated VF-126 on 15 October 1965 and disestablished on 1 April 1994.

Operational history

VA-126 was a West Coast Fleet Replacement Squadron. With its redesignation as VF-126 it became a Navy aggressor squadron.

Notable former members
Gene Cernan
Duke Cunningham
Tom Kilcline Jr. 
Mavis Black

Home port assignments
The squadron was assigned to these home ports:
NAS Miramar

Aircraft assignment
FJ-4B Fury
A-4E/M TA-4J Skyhawk
T-2C Buckeye
F-5E Tiger II
F-16N Viper

See also
 List of inactive United States Navy aircraft squadrons
 History of the United States Navy

References

1956 establishments in the United States
Aircraft squadrons of the United States Navy
Military units and formations disestablished in 1994